The Second Koizumi Cabinet was the cabinet of Japanese Prime Minister Junichiro Koizumi during his second term from November 2003 to September 2005. The cabinet was formed after the coalition of the Liberal Democratic Party and the Komeito was re-elected with a slightly reduced majority at the November 2003 general elections. The LDP lost 10 of its pre-election seats to become a minority in the National Diet, but immediately regained a majority by absorbing its coalition partner, the New Conservative Party. Koizumi had reshuffled the cabinet less than two months before the election, and so made no changes when he was re-elected by the Diet on November 19.

Political background
Koizumi had promised that if re-elected he would send the Self-Defence Forces to Iraq to assist with reconstruction before the end of the year, a pledge which proved unpopular during the election. One month into his second term, the cabinet approved the dispatch, and the SDF joined UN peacekeeping forces in Iraq in 2004, though this action continued to damage Koizumi's standing, with polls showing the public opposed. The Koizumi cabinet's policies of structural economic reforms continued during its second term, some of which proved controversial. In the spring of 2004 the government introduced reforms designed to cut pension costs by reducing state benefits and increasing user costs. This policy was not only unpopular, but cost Koizumi a minister when Chief Cabinet Secretary Yasuo Fukuda resigned after it was revealed he had failed to make his payments.

The political fallout from Iraq and the pension reforms led to poor results for the LDP in the July 2004 upper house elections. While the coalition retained its majority, and the LDP remained the largest party, the opposition DPJ narrowly won the largest number of the contested seats. This was considered a setback, and reflective of the Prime Minister's decline in popularity, but Koizumi refused to resign. Two months after the election, Koizumi conducted the first reshuffle of his second cabinet in an attempt to improve his popularity, he changed several key ministers, but kept his key economic team in place.

The centrepiece of Koizumi's economic programme, which he referred to as the "inner citadel of reform", was his plan to privatize the postal service, then the world's largest bank with 2 trillion dollars' worth of assets. This plan was deeply unpopular with many LDP members, for whom the postal service formed a large part of their base, and it was not until Koizumi's second term that his government was able to finalize the bills and introduced them into the Diet (although the LDP itself did not endorse them). Although the LDP-Komeito coalition enjoyed a lower house majority of nearly 80, when the vote finally occurred a large party rebellion saw the postal bills pass by only 5 votes in July 2005. When the plan was subsequently rejected by the House of Councillors, Koizumi immediately dissolved the Diet and called a snap election for September 2005, refused to endorse the postal rebels, and pledged to resign unless his government was returned with a majority to implement the reform. In the election, the LDP won a landslide victory, and Koizumi was re-elected to form his third cabinet in September 2005.

Election of the Prime Minister

Lists of Ministers 

R = Member of the House of Representatives
C = Member of the House of Councillors

Cabinet

Changes 
 November 21 - The New Conservative Party formally dissolved. Its members joined the LDP and remained in government.
 May 7, 2004 - Chief Cabinet Secretary Yasuo Fukuda resigned from the cabinet after a controversy in which it was revealed that he and several other ministers had failed to pay mandatory pension contributions, at a time when the government was attempting to pass contentious pension reforms. Deputy Chief Cabinet Secretary Hiroyuki Hosoda was promoted to replace him, and he in turn was replaced with Seiken Sugiura.
 July 2004 - Economic and Fiscal Policy Minister Heizō Takenaka entered the Diet for the first time when he won a seat in the House of Councillors election.

Reshuffled Cabinet

Changes 
 August 8, 2005 - Agriculture Minister Yoshinobu Shimamura was dismissed for his opposition to the dissolution of the House of Representatives over the postal privatisation bills. He was replaced with Mineichi Iwanaga.

References

External links 
Pages at the Kantei (English website):
 Koizumi Administration 
 List of Ministers 
 (Reshuffled)

Cabinet of Japan
2003 establishments in Japan
2005 disestablishments in Japan
Cabinets established in 2003
Cabinets disestablished in 2005